Ultra is a Brazilian company operating in the sectors of fuel distribution, through Ipiranga and Ultragaz; in the production of specialty chemicals, through Oxiteno; in the storage of liquid bulk, through Ultracargo; and in pharmacies, through Extrafarma, all of which are subsidiaries entirely controlled by Ultrapar holding. The company is publicly traded under the name Ultrapar on São Paulo’s stock exchange (B3)  and on New York’s (NYSE).

Ultra is Brazil's fourth largest company, and according to the yearly publication Valor 1000 of the Brazilian newspaper Valor Econômico,  its net revenue in 2013 was 60.9 billion reais (BRL).

Ultra is among the 500 largest companies in the world, according to a ranking prepared by Fortune magazine in 2014.

History
Ultra was founded on 30 August 1937 by Ernesto Igel, and originated from the first Brazilian company to bottle and distribute LPG, named Empresa Brasileira de Gás a Domicílio.  The company started its operations with a fleet of three trucks and 166 clients. It soon expanded and gave birth to Ultragaz.

Ultrapar Participações S.A. was formed in December, 1953 and extended its operations through Ultragaz's growth and the creation of new enterprises. Three businesses created during this expansion process make up what the company is today: Ultragaz itself, Oxiteno, which is Brazil's pioneer producer of ethylene oxide and its derivatives and was created in 1970, and Ultracargo, born from the union of the activities of two companies: Transultra, provider of road transport and storage of chemical and petro-chemical products, created in 1966, and Tequimar, a chemicals terminal in Aratu port, Bahia, which incorporated storage to its logistics services in 1978.

Ultra has also participated in the production of fertilizers, through Ultrafértil; in appliance retail, through Ultralar; in industrial engineering, through Ultratec; and in the production and distribution of frozen foods, through Supergel. However, it left these businesses in the 70's in order to focus on activities in which the company saw increasing demand and leadership opportunity. Ultralar and Ultragel were discontinued and Ultratec and Ultrafértil were sold. Ultracargo's transport operations were also sold in 2010, which allowed the company to focus on its strategy to grow in the storage terminals segment.

1999–2010
In 1999, Ultra went public and began to trade its shares on the stock exchanges in São Paulo and New York City. It was the first Brazilian company to go public directly in New York stock market. Such initiative enabled Ultra to have greater capacity to invest, and the company started to use its shares as currency for the acquisition of other businesses. Once capitalized, Ultra began the process of expanding its operations in the following decade.
 
Four years later, in 2003, Ultra acquired Shell Gas – a propane distributor belonging to Shell of Brazil – making Ultragaz a leader in the national LP gas market. In December of the same year, the company began its operations in the international market through the acquisition by Oxiteno of Canamex, the chemicals division of a Mexican group called Berci.
 
In 2005, Ultracargo began its operations at the intermodal terminal in the port of Santos, SP.

Two years later, in 2007, Ultra acquired the fuel distribution operation of Grupo Ipiranga in the South and Southeast of Brazil, as well as the brand Ipiranga immediately becoming the second largest liquid fuel distribution company in Brazil, with a 15% market participation.
 
In 2007, Ultra acquired União Terminais, owned at the time by União das Indústrias Petroquímicas, and turned Ultracargo into the largest operator in the trade of liquid bulk storage in Brazil, holding 30% of the Brazilian capacity.
 
In the following year, Ultra concluded the purchase of Texaco Brasil’s fuel distribution operations, increasing Ipiranga’s market participation in its sector to 23% of the national fuel market.

In November 2016, Ultrapar purchased Petrobras' liquefied petroleum gas subsidiary for $819 million. In February 2018 the CADE, did not approve the purchase.

References

External links

 
Companies listed on the New York Stock Exchange
Companies based in São Paulo
Oil and gas companies of Brazil
Companies listed on B3 (stock exchange)
Chemical companies of Brazil
Transport companies of Brazil
Chemical companies established in 1937
Conglomerate companies of Brazil
Brazilian brands
Transport companies established in 1937
Conglomerate companies established in 1937
1937 establishments in Brazil